The Blanchette Memorial Bridge is a pair of twin cantilever bridges carrying Interstate 70 across the Missouri River between St. Louis County and St. Charles County, Missouri, opened in 1959. At the bridge's crossing, the Missouri River reaches an average depth of about 45 feet. Handling an average of 165,000 vehicle transits per day, it is the area's busiest bridge. Construction of the first interstate highway project under provisions of the Federal Aid Highway Act of 1956 started west of the bridge's present location. A sign commemorating the site of the nation's first interstate project stands next to Interstate 70 just east of the Missouri Route 94/First Capitol Drive overpass.

History
The bridge is named for French Canadian fur trader and hunter Louis Blanchette, who founded St. Charles as a post along the Missouri River; the village was the first European settlement along this waterway.

Major rehabilitations for the westbound span have been addressed to MoDot in the late 2000s. The project started with the closure of the westbound span on November 4, 2012. During the closure, westbound traffic was diverted to the freeway's east side, for three narrow lanes in each direction. The westbound bridge's old superstructure was demolished in two explosions, with the first taking place on November 18, 2012. The second and final blast was on December 4, 2012. Construction of the replacement bridge started in spring 2013, and the new bridge opened more than two months ahead of schedule in August 2013. The entire project was completed in 2014.

See also
 
 
 
 List of crossings of the Missouri River

References 

Bridges in Greater St. Louis
Bridges in St. Louis County, Missouri
Bridges in St. Charles County, Missouri
Monuments and memorials in Missouri
Bridges completed in 1958
Bridges on the Interstate Highway System
Interstate 70
Road bridges in Missouri
Cantilever bridges in the United States